Étienne Noël Damilaville (21 November 1723 – 13 December 1768) was an 18th-century French man of letters, friend of Voltaire, Diderot and d'Alembert. He served in various military and administrative functions of the Ancien Régime. He was a member of the bodyguard of King Louis XV, and then a senior civil servant in the tax office responsible for supervising the Vingtième. His official roles meant that his correspondence was unexamined by censors, enabling him to circulate letters between leading thinkers of the day, most particularly during the Sirven affair.

The Encyclopédie
Damilaville authored three articles in the Encyclopédie - Population, Peace and The Vingtième.

Vingtieme 
Damilaville is believed to have coauthored an article in the Encyclopédie on the Vingtieme tax regime with Diderot, his trusted associate. His treatise is largely a discussion on the nature of government, of civil society and of the economy. Like Montesquie, Damilaville makes a clear distinction between the state, as an aggregate of people in society, and government. The treatise uses this dichotomy between the state and government to rationalize the necessity of taxes; however, Damilaville also argues tax simplification or reform. What is important in his contention for tax simplification is the purpose of having or raising taxes on participants in society. According to Damilaville, tax burdens should not be understood through the vice of ratios of an individuals' income, rather in through the ratio of taxes that concern an individual's sustenance after their monies have been deducted.

Friendship with Voltaire
Voltaire regarded him as a very close friend, and wrote him at least 539 letters over eight years. They only actually met, for the first time, after they had been corresponding for five years, on  20 August 1765, when Damilaville visited Ferney.

Opinion of Damilaville was not universally positive: Melchior Grimm said of him:

References

Bibliography 
 Emmanuel Boussuge et Françoise Launay, « L'ami D'Amilaville », 2014, n° 49, (p. 25–41).
 Emmanuel Boussuge et Françoise Launay, "Étienne Noël D'Amilaville (1723–1768)",  ''Les collaborateurs de l'Encyclopédie, projet d'Edition Numérique Collaborative et Critique de l'Encyclopédie' (6 January 2015)

External links 
 
 Damilaville on Wikisource
 Généalogie des Damilaville.
 Autre publication: article "Paix" de l'Encyclopédie.

18th-century French philosophers
Enlightenment philosophers
Contributors to the Encyclopédie (1751–1772)
Writers from Bordeaux
1723 births
1768 deaths
Denis Diderot
Voltaire
Military personnel from Bordeaux